Pete Wilhoit is an American drummer and a member of the band Fiction Plane.

Musical career
Wilhoit grew up Bloomington, Indiana and attended Indiana University, where he studied jazz and percussion. His teachers included  David Baker, Shawn Pelton, and Kenny Aronoff. In 1991 he started his first band, The Cutters, with friends from Bloomington. The band was signed to BMG, lasted for eleven years, and released two albums and two EPs. He was also a session musician during this time and contributed to over thirty albums by other musicians.

In 2003 Wilhoit drove from Indiana to New York City to audition for the band Fiction Plane, which impressed Joe Sumner, the band's founder, lead singer, and bassist who hired him. Fiction Plane toured with Sting in 2005 and in 2007 became the opening band for The Police Reunion Tour.

Wilhoit has also played or recorded with Mike Doughty, Sharon Corr, Ari Hest, Declan O'Rourke, Carrie Newcomer, Laura Critchley, Michael McDonald, Bob Dorough, Michael Brunnock, and I Blame Coco.

Discography

With Fiction Plane
 Everything Will Never Be OK (MCA, 2003 )
 Bitter Forces and Lame Race Horses (Everybody's, 2005)
 Left Side of the Brain (Bieler Bros., 2007) 
 Paradiso (2009)
 Sparks (Roadrunner, 2010) 
 Mondo Lumina (Rhyme & Reason, 2015)

Other
 1995 The Cutters – The Cutters
 1997 Indianapolis Intergalactic Spaceport – Beeble Brox
 1998 Sonic Wave Love – The Cutters
 1998 3rd Man – 3rd Man
 1999 Squall – Kevin McCormick
 2000 Flypaper Highway  – The Cutters
 2001 Window on the Soul – Craig Brenner
 2002 Flamingo – Simon Rowe
 2003 Ballads for a Rainy Afternoon – Bob Williams
 2007 Cover Their Eyes – Krista Detor
 2007 What Have You Gone and Done? – Monika Herzig
 2009 New Reality – Rudie Kay
 2010 Picturesque – Chase Coy
 2014 Flat Earth Diary – Krista Detor
 2014 Live at Ken's House – Mike Doughty
 2014 Stellar Motel – Mike Doughty

External links
 Official website
 [ AllMusic.com] Pete Wilhoit at AllMusic.com
 Hardball Times Interview with Pete Wilhoit about his passion for baseball (2008)

References

Living people
American rock drummers
Musicians from Bloomington, Indiana
Musicians from Indiana
1971 births
20th-century American drummers
American male drummers
21st-century American drummers
20th-century American male musicians
21st-century American male musicians